Indirect presidential elections were held in Colombia in 1886. Rafael Núñez was elected unanimously.

Background
Following the promulgation of the 1886 constitution, the Council of Delegates selected a president and vice president to serve a six-year term until elections in 1892. The Council also elected the Designdao, a designated replacement for the president.

Results

President

Vice President

Designado

References

Colombia
Presidential elections in Colombia
President